Kapuluppada is a neighborhood situated on the northern part of Visakhapatnam City, India. The area, which falls under the local administrative limits of Greater Visakhapatnam Municipal Corporation, is about 25 km from the Visakhapatnam Railway Station.

About
Kapuluppada is one of the future Andhra Pradesh State Information Technology centers that the government of Andhra Pradesh is planning to set up many software companies there.

Transport

APSRTC routes

See also 

 Fintech Valley Vizag
Visakhapatnam

References

Neighbourhoods in Visakhapatnam